Illidgea is a genus of moths of the family Xyloryctidae.

Species
 Illidgea aethalodes Turner, 1902
 Illidgea epigramma (Meyrick, 1890)

References

Xyloryctidae
Xyloryctidae genera